Ghassan Halazon is a Jordanian-Canadian technology and e-commerce entrepreneur. He founded EMERGE Commerce, Inc., a Toronto based acquirer and operator of direct-to-consumer e-commerce brands.

Life
Halazon was born and raised in Amman, Jordan. He attended McGill University in Montreal, Quebec, and holds an MBA from Georgetown University. He currently resides in Toronto, Ontario.

Career
Halazon worked with Citigroup as an investment banker in New York before his foray into e-commerce and technology startups that began in 2010.

He founded his most recent venture, EMERGE Commerce Inc., formerly Transformational Capital Corp., an e-commerce consolidator, in 2016.

In 2019, Halazon was personally fined by the Canadian Radio-television and Telecommunications Commission as part of violations incurred by previous e-commerce ventures and holding companies he owned and/or directed. 

EMERGE Commerce completed its public listing on the Toronto Venture Exchange on December 14, 2020, under ticker TSXV: ECOM.

Halazon is a member in the Board of Directors of the Canadian Arab Institute.

Public speaking
In 2011, Halazon presented a talk at the TEDx Talk Dead Sea. In 2018, he presented a talk at the TechTO conference entitled 'Beyond the Wreckage. In November 2018, Halazon was a speaker at the Harvard Arab Conference.

Media appearances
In 2011, Halazon was listed among Canada's 30 most eligible bachelors by Canada's National Post.

Halazon appeared on the Canadian version of the entrepreneurship reality TV show "Dragon's Den," and attributed some of his success with TeamBuy to the exposure gained through the show.

Philanthropy
Halazon sits on the Board of Directors of the Be-Abled Society, a non-profit organization that assists people with non-visible disabilities transition back into everyday life.

References

Year of birth missing (living people)
Living people
Canadian people of Arab descent
Canadian company founders
Businesspeople from Toronto
Jordanian emigrants to Canada
McDonough School of Business alumni
McGill University alumni